Battle of Donbas may refer to:
Russian Civil War
Donbas-Don operation (1918)
Battle for the Donbas (1919)
Donbas operation (1919)
World War II
Donbas operation (1941)
Operation Little Saturn (1942)
Operation Gallop (January 1943)
Donbas strategic offensive (July 1943)
Donbas strategic offensive (August 1943)
Russo-Ukrainian War
War in Donbas (2014–2022)
Battle of Donbas (2022–present)